Polygonum boreale is a species of flowering plant belonging to the family Polygonaceae.

Its native range is Canada to Subarctic Eurasia.

References

boreale